Mujnai railway station is the railway station which serves the town of Sishubari, along with tea gardens like Mujnai, Chapaguri, Gopalpur, Dumchi, Khairbari, Ramjhora  etc. of Alipurduar district in the Indian state of West Bengal. It lies in the New Jalpaiguri–Alipurduar–Samuktala Road line of Northeast Frontier Railway zone, Alipurduar railway division. Local trains along with some important trains like Siliguri–Alipurduar Intercity Express etc. are available from this station.

References

Alipurduar railway division
Railway stations in West Bengal
Railway stations in Alipurduar district